Vatlur railway station (station code:VAT) serves the village of Vatluru in Andhra Pradesh, India. It is on the Howrah–Chennai main line around 8 km from Eluru railway station. It is under Vijayawada division of South Central Railway.

Passenger amenities 
It has two platforms, serving up and down trains. It has a general ticket booking counter. First platform has cement seatings for passengers. It also has a general waiting hall on first platform. Local passenger trains stop at this station.

Electrification 
The Visakhapatnam–Vijayawada section was completely electrified by 1997. The Howrah–Chennai route was completely electrified by 2005. A SSP is built beside Vatlur railway station.

Classification 
In terms of earnings and outward passengers handled, Vatlur is categorized as a Non-Suburban Grade-6 (NSG-6) railway station. Based on the re–categorization of Indian Railway stations for the period of 2017–18 and 2022–23, an NSG–6 category station earns nearly  crore and handles close to  passengers.

References 

Railway stations in West Godavari district
Vijayawada railway division
Railway stations in Eluru